Ruwayfi ibn Thabit al-Ansari (7th century) was the deputy commander of Tripoli for the Egypt-based Umayyad commander Mu'awiya ibn Hudayj. He led the Muslim raid against the Byzantine controlled island of Djerba in modern Tunisia. He may have led a second raid against Djerba alongside the Ansarite Fadala ibn Ubayd.

References

Bibliography

Arab people of the Arab–Byzantine wars
7th-century Arabs